Federal Route 3685, or Jalan Tengku Ampuan Intan Zaharah, is an industrial federal road in Kuala Nerus, Terengganu, Malaysia.

The Kilometre Zero is located at Bulatan roundabout.

At most sections, the Federal Route 3685 was built under the JKR R5 road standard, with a speed limit of 90 km/h.

There is one overlap: Wakaf Tembesu-Bulatan - 65 Jalan Lapangan Terbang Sultan Mahmud.

List of junctions and towns

References

Malaysian Federal Roads